Wagnerian rock is the merger of 20th-century rock and roll and 19th-century opera reminiscent of Richard Wagner or Phil Spector's Wall of Sound. The term was coined by songwriter and producer Jim Steinman to describe Meat Loaf's Bat Out of Hell trilogy of albums.

Notable artists
Bonnie Tyler
Jim Steinman
King Crimson
Meat Loaf
Cranes

See also 
Progressive rock
Symphonic metal
Rock opera

References

Richard Wagner
Rock music genres
Phil Spector
1970s in music
1980s in music
1990s in music